This article uses Logar transcription.

The Kostel dialect, in Croatian literature also eastern microdialects of Western Goran subdialect, is a dialect, spoken along the Kupa Valley in Slovenia and Croatia, around Banja Loka and Brod na Kupi. Dialect originates from Alpine Slavic, a predecessor of nowadays Slovene, but speakers living in Croatia self-identify as speaking Croatian. Dialect borders Mixed Kočevje subdialects to the north, Southern White Carniolan and Eastern Goran dialect to the east, Čabranka dialect to the west, and Goran dialects to the south and east, as well Shtokavian, which is spoken in Moravice and neighbouring villages. The dialect belongs to the Lower Carniolan dialect group, and evolved from the Lower Carniolan dialect base. Until recently, neighbouring Čabranka dialect considered to be a part of Kostel dialect, but it was later discovered both dialects evolved differently, but are in process of becoming more similar to each other.

Geographical distribution 
Kostel dialect is spoken in Croatia, but the northernmost part extends into southern Slovenia. It extends from Kuželj and Gornji Turni in the west, south to Ravna Gora, as far east as Razdrto and north to Banja Loka and Kostel.It is the southernmost Slovene dialect. Notable settlements include Kuželj, Guče Selo, Brod na Kupi, Krivac, Gornji Turni, Kupjak, Ravna Gora, Skrad, Brod Moravice, Lokvica and Šimatovo in Croatia, and Vas, Fara, Kuželj and Potok in Slovenia.

The border between Kostel dialect, South White Carniolan dialect and Mixed kočevje subdialects is a bit unclear and Kostel dialect might also extend down the Kupa river on Slovene side.

Accentual changes 
Kostel dialect lost the difference between high- and low-pitched accent, both on long and short vowels, which are still differentiated. It also underwent three accent shifts:   → ,  → ,  /  →  / ,  → , and  →  accent shift.

Phonology 
Almost all vowels have monophthongized, which sets this dialect apart from all other Lower Carniolan dialects.

 Non-final  and  turned into .
 Non-final  and  turned into .
 Non-final  and  became .
 Non-final  and  became .
 Non-final  and  evolved into long or short .
Unstressed  evolved into . Banja Loka and Delač microdialects also have unstressed long vowels, which became unstressed after accent shifts.

Word-final  mostly turned into . Palatal  and  have not depalatalized. It, however, lost the  before  at the beginning of a word. Alpine Slovene  evolved into non-sonorant , which devoices if at the end of a word or before a non-voiced consonant. Other consonant simplifications also appeared, such as  → .

Morphology 
Dual forms were fully replaced by plural forms. Future and preterite tense are formed using the l-participle.

Vocabulary 
A priest and slavicist Jože Gregorič collected almost 17 000 words spoken in Slovene part of Kostel dialect, from Srobotnik to Grgelj, which is currently still listed as belonging to Mixed Kočevje subdialects and published a dictionary of Kostel dialect.

References

Bibliography 

 
 

Slovene dialects